Jeryan Nejaima is a district in Qatar, located in the municipality of Ad Dawhah. It is primarily a residential district containing many villas.

Together with Al Tarfa and Jelaiah, it makes up Zone 68 which has a total population of 5,521 as of 2015. Jeryan Nejaima Street separates it from Al Tarfa to the east.

Landmarks

Al Furjan Market on Saha 363 Street.
Al Furjan Market on Saha 254 Street.
Al Furjan Market on Saha 259 Street.
Al Furjan Market on Saha 245 Street.
Al Furjan Market on Saha 241 Street.
Jeryan Nejaima Park on Saha 261 Street.
Al Meera Supercenter on Al Dehailiyat Street.

Gallery

References

Communities in Doha